James Kimball "Kim" Gannon (November 18, 1900 – April 29, 1974)  was an American songwriter, more commonly a lyricist than a composer.

Biography
Gannon was born in Brooklyn, New York to an Irish-American family from Fort Ann in upstate New York, but grew up in New Jersey where he attended Montclair High School and was a member of The Omega Gamma Delta Fraternity. He graduated from St. Lawrence University and, intending to become a lawyer, attended the Albany Law School, passing the bar examination in New York State in 1934.

In 1939 he wrote his first song, "For Tonight". His 1942 song, "Moonlight Cocktail", was recorded by the Glenn Miller Orchestra and was the best-selling record in the United States for 10 weeks. In 1942 he began writing songs for films, beginning with the lyrics of the title song for Always in My Heart. He subsequently contributed songs to other films, including The Powers Girl and If Winter Comes. In 1951 he turned to the Broadway stage, joining with composer Walter Kent to write the score for Seventeen.

Gannon collaborated with a number of writers, including, J. Fred Coots, Walter Kent, Josef Myrow, Max Steiner, Jule Styne, Mabel Wayne, and Luckey Roberts.

He died in Lake Worth, Florida, at the age of 73.

Songs
Among songs which Gannon wrote or co-wrote are the following:
"Alma Mater (St. Lawrence University)"
"Always in My Heart (1942 Song)with Kim Gannon on Lyrics 
"Angel in Disguise"
"Autumn Nocturne"
"Croce di Oro"
"Don't Worry"
"A Dreamer's Holiday"
"Easy as Pie"
"Five O'Clock Whistle"
"The Gentleman Needs a Shave"
"Hey Doc!"
"I'll Be Home for Christmas"
"I Understand"
"I Want to Be Wanted", his final hit
"Johnny Appleseed"
"Make Love to Me" (not the 1954 song of that title, but an earlier one)
"Moonlight Cocktail"
"Pioneer Song"
"Romance a la Mode" (with Arthur Altman)
"Under Paris Skies" (English lyrics)

References

Songwriters from New York (state)
American lyricists
1900 births
1974 deaths
American people of Irish descent
Albany Law School alumni
St. Lawrence University alumni
20th-century American musicians